Glyphodes umbria is a moth of the family Crambidae described by George Hampson in 1898. It is known from Fergusson Island of Papua New Guinea.

This species has a wingspan of 43 mm.

References

External links
Boldsystems.org: images

Moths described in 1898
Moths of Papua New Guinea
Glyphodes